Baldevins bryllup is a 1926 Norwegian comedy film directed by George Schnéevoigt, starring Einar Sissener and Victor Bernau. The film is based on a play by Vilhelm Krag, and tells the story of how Simen Sørensen (Bernau) manages to get his friend Baldevin Jonassen (Sissener) married to the lady next door. The film was renovated in 2006, for the 100th anniversary of Kristiansand Cinema.

Cast
 Einar Sissener as Baldevin Jonassen 
 Victor Bernau as Simen Sørensen 
 Johanne Voss as Ollevine 
 Betzy Holter as Madam Salvesen 
 Jens Holstad as Hoppe, a carpenter
 Nicolai Johannsen as Braa, a skipper 
 Hilda Fredriksen as Miss Bertelsen 
 Sverre Arnesen as Müller, a shipping master in Lübeck 
 Amund Rydland as a silverware thief 
 Karl Holter as a butcher 
 Ernst Albert as an innkeeper

References

External links
 
 Baldevins bryllup at Filmweb.no (Norwegian)

1926 films
1926 comedy films
Norwegian silent films
Norwegian black-and-white films
Norwegian comedy films
Films directed by George Schnéevoigt
1920s Norwegian-language films